Masayoshi is a masculine Japanese given name.

Possible writings
Masayoshi can be written using different kanji characters and can mean:
, "correct, justice, righteous; wherefore, a reason"
, "correct, justice, righteous; righteousness, justice, morality, honor, loyalty, meaning"
, "correct, justice, righteous; rejoice, take pleasure in"
, "correct, justice, righteous; intimate, friendly, harmonious"
, "correct, justice, righteous; graceful, gentle, pure"
, "correct, justice, righteous; good luck, joy, congratulations"
, "correct, justice, righteous; perfume, balmy, favorable, fragrant"
, "prosperous, bright, clear; good, pleasing, skilled"
, "prosperous, bright, clear; righteousness, justice, morality, honor, loyalty, meaning"
, "prosperous, bright, clear; good, bribe, servant"
, "gracious, elegant, graceful, refined; best regards, good"
, "gracious, elegant, graceful, refined; auspicious, happiness, blessedness, good omen, good fortune"
, "gracious, elegant, graceful, refined; intelligent, wise, wisdom, cleverness"
, "holy, saint, sage, master, priest; righteousness, justice, morality, honor, loyalty, meaning"
, "politics, government; righteousness, justice, morality, honor, loyalty, meaning"
, "direction, person, alternative; righteousness, justice, morality, honor, loyalty, meaning"
, "leader, commander, general, admiral, or, and again, soon, from now on, just about; righteousness, justice, morality, honor, loyalty, meaning"
, "tenderness, excel, surpass, actor, superiority, gentleness; fond, pleasing, like something"
, "correct, save, assist; good, pleasing, skilled"
The name can also be written in hiragana or katakana.

People with the name
, Japanese daimyō
, Japanese jockey
, Japanese engineer
, Japanese politician
, Japanese actor
, Japanese Rōjū
, Japanese politician
, Japanese-French musician
, Japanese sprinter
, Japanese baseball player
, Japanese samurai
, Japanese entomologist
, Japanese volleyball player
, Japanese politician
, Japanese professional wrestler
, Japanese mathematician
, Japanese politician
, Japanese politician
, Japanese football referee
, Japanese politician
, Japanese Protestant missionary and educator
, Japanese sumo wrestler
, Japanese samurai
, Japanese politician
, Japanese video game composer
, Korean-Japanese businessman
, Japanese guitarist
, Japanese politician
, Japanese journalist
, Japanese musician
, Japanese chemist
, Japanese professor
, Japanese artistic gymnast
, Japanese bass guitarist
, Japanese musician
, Japanese footballer
, Japanese politician

Japanese masculine given names